Samansa may refer to:

 the Japanese form of the name Samantha
 the character Samansa Grey in the manga series Hyper Police
 the song "Samansa" on the album Samantha by 1980s Japanese girl band Go-Bang's
 the label Samansa of the Japanese adult film company Max-A